Barrytown (originally known as Seventeen Mile Beach and Fosbery) is a town in the West Coast region of New Zealand's South Island. Punakaiki is  further north. The town is near the southern end of Pakiroa Beach. The Māori name for the region is Paparoa.

History
The land is originally Māori, and the local hapū is Ngāti Waewae of the iwi Ngāi Tahu. Pakiroa Beach along the Barrytown Flats was an important food source for local Māori, and middens of tuatua shells attributed to the iwi Waitaha have been dated to 1500 AD.

A gold rush in the 1860s led to workings at Seventeen Mile Beach and Canoe Creek, and by 1879 about 2000 miners were living in the area. In 1880 the township serving the miners was officially named "Fosebery" and a post office opened. The following year, however, a government opinion poll of residents and miners was held to choose between Fosbery and Barrytown. The 130 votes were unanimous for Barrytown.

By 1895, Barrytown had a Catholic church, a state school, two lodging-houses (Luis's and Cargill's), a smithy, and the All Nations Hotel. The two general stores, one including and butchery and bakery, were established in 1870 and 1879. The post office dispatched mail twice a week. By 1901 the population had dropped to 64, with an additional 60 people in the surrounding area.

Demographics
According to the 2013 New Zealand census, Barrytown and its surrounds (covering 195 square kilometres) had a population of 237, an increase of 12 people since the 2006 census.

The 2018 statistical area of Barrytown, which covers 731 square kilometres, had a population of 939 at the 2018 New Zealand census, an increase of 30 people (3.3%) since the 2013 census, and an increase of 21 people (2.3%) since the 2006 census. There were 411 households. There were 492 males and 450 females, giving a sex ratio of 1.09 males per female. The median age was 48.8 years (compared with 37.4 years nationally), with 150 people (16.0%) aged under 15 years, 120 (12.8%) aged 15 to 29, 525 (55.9%) aged 30 to 64, and 147 (15.7%) aged 65 or older.

Ethnicities were 93.6% European/Pākehā, 9.6% Māori, 1.9% Pacific peoples, 2.2% Asian, and 2.9% other ethnicities (totals add to more than 100% since people could identify with multiple ethnicities).

The proportion of people born overseas was 11.2%, compared with 27.1% nationally.

Although some people objected to giving their religion, 58.8% had no religion, 26.5% were Christian, 0.3% were Hindu, 0.6% were Muslim and 2.9% had other religions.

Of those at least 15 years old, 84 (10.6%) people had a bachelor or higher degree, and 168 (21.3%) people had no formal qualifications. The median income was $26,500, compared with $31,800 nationally. The employment status of those at least 15 was that 384 (48.7%) people were employed full-time, 138 (17.5%) were part-time, and 39 (4.9%) were unemployed.

Economy and culture 

Barrytown is a hub for arts and crafts, including stone carving and knife making.

All Nations Hotel 
The Barrytown hotel was built in 1879, and taken over by Thomas Burns in 1884. It had seven bedrooms, and an additional building that slept 10. It was notable for its billiard room with an Alcock table. The hotel is still in operation today.

Barrytown Settlers Hall 
Built in 1929, the Barrytown Settlers Hall is a well-known music venue and has been hosting gigs since 1972. International and local bands touring New Zealand often perform there include Blerta, Trinity Roots, the New Zealand Guitar Quartet, Karen Pfeiffer, Scott Cook and The Kugels, The Mint Chicks, Bad Manners and Don McGlashan. There have been as many as 25 events per year. In 2017, a crowdsourcing campaign (through 'Give a Little') was started to fund the soundproofing of the hall following resident complaints about noise.

Education
The first school was built in the early 1880s after an inspector for the Westland Education Board visited Barrytown and determined there were 57 children of school age. The Central Board recommended that a school be built and a school committee established.

Barrytown School is a coeducational full primary (years 1–8) school with a roll of  students as of

References

Grey District
Populated places in the West Coast, New Zealand